Norman H. Baker was a professor of astrophysics at Columbia University. He was born in Fergus Falls, Minnesota on October 23, 1931, and died on October 11, 2005, in Watertown, New York.
His research primarily involved computational investigations of stellar structure and evolution; in particular, he focused on pulsating variable stars and he is considered as one of the founders of modern pulsation theory. From 1975 until 1983, he was the editor of the Astronomical Journal and served as president of IAU Commission 27 during the term of 1982 - 1985.

Links

References

American astronomers
Columbia University faculty
Cornell University alumni
1931 births
2005 deaths
The Astronomical Journal editors